Bustocco and Legnanese (natively  and ) are two dialects of Western Lombard, spoken respectively in the cities of Busto Arsizio (Province of Varese) and Legnano (Province of Milan), Lombardy.

Although there is little evidence of Ligurian settlements in the area, they are widely thought to have been characterised by the Ligurian substratum. While Legnanese is closer to the Milanese dialect, Bustocco is especially considered very similar to the modern Ligurian language, for example for the frequent unstressed  at the end of masculine nouns and other words is more frequent (e.g. Bustocco  "to work" = Legnanese ). In both dialects stressed  sounds like a mix between a and o.

A comic theatrical group called I Legnanesi uses Legnanese (with simplified grammar and lexicon heavily based on Italian) in its shows.

References

Western Lombard language